William II, Count of Eu, feudal baron of Hastings (died about 1095) was a first generation Anglo-Norman nobleman, Count of Eu and rebel.

Origins
According to most authorities he was the son and heir of Robert, Count of Eu, (died before 1093), by his wife Beatrix de Falaise.

Career
William of Eu held about seventy-seven manors in the west of England and was one of the rebels against King William II of England in 1088. Although he made his peace with that King, together with William of Aldrie (his wife's nephew), Roger de Lacy and Robert de Mowbray, he conspired to murder William II and to replace him on the throne with Stephen of Aumale, the King's cousin.

In 1095 the rebels impounded four Norwegian trading ships and refused the King's demand to return the merchandise. King William conducted a lightning campaign, outflanking the rebels at Newcastle upon Tyne and capturing a rebel stronghold at Morpeth in Northumberland. He besieged the rebels at Bamburgh Castle and built a castle facing the surviving one. During January 1097 in Salisbury, William was formally accused of treason, challenged to trial by battle and was defeated by Geoffrey Baynard, former High Sheriff of Yorkshire.  It was finally decided that William was to be blinded and castrated. William died sometime later and was buried at Hastings.William's son Henry inherited the countship of Eu and also became Lord of Hastings.

Marriage and children
William married twice:
Firstly to Beatrice de Builli, daughter of Roger I de Builly (d. circa 1098/1100), feudal baron of Tickhill in Yorkshire and sister and heiress of Roger II de Builli. By this first wife he had one son:
Henry I, Count of Eu, feudal baron of Hastings (d. 1140). 
Secondly to Helisende d'Avranches, daughter of Richard le Goz, Viscount of Avranches, and sister of Hugh d'Avranches, Earl of Chester (d. 1101).

Notes

References

Sources

11th-century births
1090s deaths
11th-century Normans
11th-century English nobility
English rebels
Year of birth unknown
Year of death uncertain
Anglo-Normans
William of Eu
Devon Domesday Book tenants-in-chief
Norman warriors
William II of England